Manduca jordani is a moth of the  family Sphingidae. It is known from Argentina and Bolivia.

References

Manduca
Moths described in 1912